HMS M20  was a First World War Royal Navy M15-class monitor.

Design

Intended as a shore bombardment vessel, M20s primary armament was a single 9.2 inch Mk VI gun removed from the  HMS Gibraltar. In addition to her 9.2-inch gun she also possessed one 12 pounder and one six-pound anti-aircraft gun. She was equipped with a four-shaft Bolinder two-cylinder semi-diesel engine with 640 horsepower that allowed a top speed of eleven knots. The monitor's crew consisted of sixty-nine officers and men.

Construction
HMS M20 ordered in March, 1915, as part of the War Emergency Programme of ship construction. She was laid down at the Sir Raylton Dixon & Co. Ltd shipyard at Govan in March 1915, launched on 11 May 1915, and completed in July 1915.

World War 1
M20 served within the Mediterranean from August 1915 to December 1918. She did not return to Home Waters, paying off at Malta.

Disposal
M20 was sold on 29 January 1920 for mercantile service as an oil tanker and renamed 'Lima'.

References

 
 Dittmar, F. J. & Colledge, J. J., "British Warships 1914–1919", (Ian Allan, London, 1972), 

 

M15-class monitors
1915 ships
World War I monitors of the United Kingdom
Royal Navy ship names